Thomas Gallagher may refer to:

Politics
 Thomas Gallagher (Illinois politician) (1850–1930), U.S. Representative from Illinois
 Thomas Gallagher (mayor) (1883–1967), mayor of Pittsburgh
 Tom Gallagher (born 1944), Florida politician 
 Tom Gallagher (Massachusetts politician), member of the Massachusetts House of Representatives
 Tommy Gallagher (politician) (born 1942), Irish nationalist

Other
 Thomas C. Gallagher, chief executive officer of the Genuine Parts Company
 Thomas F. Gallagher (1897–1985), Minnesota Supreme Court judge, 1943–1967
 Thomas Gerard Gallagher (born 1954), British professor
 Tommy Gallagher (rugby league) (born 1983), rugby league player for Leigh Centurions
 Tommy Gallagher (trainer), boxing trainer seen on TV show The Contender
 Tom Gallagher (diplomat) (1940–2018), American diplomat
 Thomas Gallagher (swimmer) (born 1999), Australian Paralympic swimmer
 Thomas Gallagher (writer) (1918–1992), American writer

See also
 Tom Gallacher (1932–2001), Scottish playwright